The 1992 California State Assembly elections were held on November 3, 1992. California's State Assembly in its entirety comes up for election in even numbered years. Each seat has a two-year term and members are limited to three 2-year terms (six years). All 80 biennially elected seats in the Assembly were up for election this year. Democrats expanded their majority by one seat.

Overview

Results 
Final results from the California Secretary of State:

District 1

District 2

District 3

District 4

District 5

District 6

District 7

District 8

District 9

District 10

District 11

District 12

District 13

District 14

District 15

District 16

District 17

District 18

District 19

District 20

District 21

District 22

District 23

District 24

District 25

District 26

District 27

District 28

District 29

District 30

District 31

District 32

District 33

District 34

District 35

District 36

District 37

District 38

District 39

District 40

District 41

District 42

District 43

District 44

District 45

District 46

District 47

District 48

District 49

District 50

District 51

District 52

District 53

District 54

District 55

District 56

District 57

District 58

District 59

District 60

District 61

District 62

District 63

District 64

District 65

District 66

District 67

District 68

District 69

District 70

District 71

District 72

District 73

District 74

District 75

District 76

District 77

District 78

District 79

District 80

See also
California State Senate
California State Senate elections, 1992
California State Assembly Districts
California state elections, 1992
Districts in California
Political party strength in California
Political party strength in U.S. states

External links

California Legislative District Maps (1911-Present)
RAND California Election Returns: District Definitions

Assembly
1992
California State Assembly